Jackson Township is a township in Butler County, Pennsylvania, United States. The population was 3,657 at the 2010 census.

Geography
Jackson Township is located in southwestern Butler County, with Beaver County to the west. The boroughs of Zelienople and Harmony are in the western part of the township but are separate from it. The borough of Evans City lies along part of the township's eastern border but is also separate from the township. The unincorporated community of Eidenau is east of Harmony.

Connoquenessing Creek, a tributary of the Beaver River, flows from east to west through the northern part of the township.

History
European settlers began arriving along Breakneck Creek, a tributary of the Connoquenessing, around 1800. Around the same time, present-day Zelienople and Harmony were settled. Among the first settlers in the area were James Magee (born in County Down, present-day Northern Ireland, in 1769) in the Connoquenessing Valley in 1797 and William Martin (born in Ireland) along Breakneck Creek. The Harmony Society also made its first settlement in the United States in present-day Jackson Township. Jackson Township was ultimately formed from parts of Cranberry Township and Connoquenessing Township in 1854. Early industries in the area included coal, iron ore, and limestome extraction, timber production, and farming on the low-lying, flatter areas of the Connoquenessing Valley, where the fertility of the soil was conducive to it.

Demographics

As of the census of 2000, there were 3,645 people, 1,358 households, and 1,029 families residing in the township.  The population density was 172.2 people per square mile (66.5/km).  There were 1,439 housing units at an average density of 68.0/sq mi (26.3/km).  The racial makeup of the township was 98.02% White, 0.91% African American, 0.08% Native American, 0.27% Asian, 0.16% from other races, and 0.55% from two or more races. Hispanic or Latino of any race were 0.30% of the population.

There were 1,358 households, out of which 30.2% had children under the age of 18 living with them, 64.9% were married couples living together, 8.6% had a female householder with no husband present, and 24.2% were non-families. 20.3% of all households were made up of individuals, and 6.4% had someone living alone who was 65 years of age or older.  The average household size was 2.60 and the average family size was 3.01.

In the township the population was spread out, with 22.5% under the age of 18, 7.0% from 18 to 24, 28.6% from 25 to 44, 25.4% from 45 to 64, and 16.5% who were 65 years of age or older.  The median age was 41 years. For every 100 females, there were 95.7 males.  For every 100 females age 18 and over, there were 92.9 males.

The median income for a household in the township was $46,992, and the median income for a family was $53,710. Males had a median income of $42,531 versus $25,987 for females. The per capita income for the township was $23,141.  About 5.0% of families and 8.3% of the population were below the poverty line, including 16.4% of those under age 18 and 7.5% of those age 65 or over.

Economy
In September 2014 a regional distribution center for FedEx was proposed.  FedEx committed to the facility in November 2014, for completion in 2016.

References

External links
Jackson Township official website

Populated places established in 1797
Pittsburgh metropolitan area
Townships in Butler County, Pennsylvania
Townships in Pennsylvania